The Wyoming Wing of the Civil Air Patrol (CAP) is the highest echelon of Civil Air Patrol in the state of Wyoming. Wyoming Wing headquarters are located in Cheyenne, Wyoming. The Wyoming Wing consists of over 250 cadet and adult members at over 9 locations across the state of Wyoming.

Mission
The Civil Air Patrol has three primary missions: providing emergency services; offering cadet programs for youth; and providing aerospace education for CAP members and the general public.

Emergency services
The Civil Air Patrol provides emergency services, including search and rescue missions directed by the Air Force Rescue Coordination Center at Tyndall Air Force Base. The Civil Air Patrol also performs disaster relief missions, including air and ground transportation and an extensive communications network; and humanitarian services, including transporting time-sensitive medical materials including blood and human tissue, often on behalf of the Red Cross when conventional methods of transport are unavailable.

The Civil Air Patrol provides Air Force support through the conducting of light transport, communications support, and low-altitude route surveys. In addition, CAP offers support to counter-drug operations.

In 2014, the Wyoming Wing was activated to provide aerial photography of flood damage for the Wyoming National Guard. In May 2020, the Wyoming Wing assisted in Wyoming's response to the COVID-19 pandemic. The Wyoming Wing was charged with flying coronavirus test kits from Sublette County to the Wyoming Public Health Laboratory in Cheyenne.

Cadet programs
The Civil Air Patrol offers a cadet program to youth aged 12-21. Cadets take part in a 16-step program which covers aerospace education, leadership training, physical fitness and moral leadership.

The Wyoming Wing offers an encampment which provides cadets with additional training.

Aerospace education
The Civil Air Patrol offers aerospace education to two different audiences: volunteer CAP members and the general public. The internal aerospace education program for CAP members has two parts: cadet and senior. Cadets complete aerospace education as one of the requirements to progress through the achievement levels of the cadet program, while senior members are expected to familiarize themselves with the AE program for cadets and aerospace issues.
                             
CAP's external aerospace programs for the general public are conducted through the nation's educational system.  Each year, CAP sponsors workshops focusing on advances in aerospace technology in various states across the United States. CAP's aerospace education members receive more than 20 free aerospace education classroom materials.

Organization

See also
Awards and decorations of the Civil Air Patrol
Wyoming Air National Guard

References

External links
Wyoming Wing Civil Air Patrol official website

Wings of the Civil Air Patrol
Education in Wyoming
Military in Wyoming